Chan Sin Yuk (born 4 July 2002 in Kowloon) is a Hong Kong professional squash player. As of May 2021, she was ranked number 221 in the world.

References

2002 births
Living people
Hong Kong female squash players